The Education of Little Tree is a 1997 American drama film written and directed by Richard Friedenberg, and starring James Cromwell, Joseph Ashton, Tantoo Cardinal, Graham Greene, and Mika Boorem. It is based on the controversial 1976 fictional memoir of the same title by Asa Earl Carter (writing pseudonymously as "Forrest Carter", a supposedly Cherokee writer) about an orphaned boy raised by his paternal Scottish-descent grandfather and Cherokee grandmother in the Great Smoky Mountains.

Writer-director Friedenberg co-adapted the screenplay for the film alongside Earl Hamner Jr. and Don Sipes, shortly after completing his adaptation for Robert Redford's A River Runs Through It (1992). In the United States, the film was given a limited release through Paramount Pictures on Christmas Day 1997, less than one week after the release of Paramount's record-breaking box-office hit Titanic (1997), and grossed $323,411 domestically.

Friedenberg was nominated for a Humanitas Prize for Best Feature Film, while Cardinal and Greene both won First Americans in the Arts Awards for their performances. The film also nominated for three Young Artist Awards, winning twoone for Ashton's performance, and a Jackie Coogan Award for best feature.

Plot
In the 1930s, an eight-year-old boy who is given the Native American name "Little Tree" (Joseph Ashton) was being raised alone by his mother, having been widowed by war, and is left an orphan when she dies of illness. His white mother's sister comes to take him but his paternal grandfather (James Cromwell) and grandmother (Tantoo Cardinal), whose ancestors had escaped from the Trail of Tears and hidden in the Great Smoky Mountains, arrive and take the boy to live with them. In his grandparents' care, the boy learns about his heritage as a Native American through them and their Cherokee friend Willow John (Graham Greene). Little Tree is not only taught how to live the Native way as one with the Earth but also to 'learn a trade' passed down through his grandpa's Scottish heritage, whiskey making. This leads to conflict with professional still thieves.

A complaint filed with child services by his white aunt gives reason for the government to take him into custody. Little Tree is removed from his home by the government and placed in the Notched Gap Indian School, a fictional Native American boarding school whose mission is to reform Native children and make them assimilate into the dominant white culture by stripping him of his Native heritage. Little Tree's grandfather, made aware of his desire to go home through the help of Willow John, soon rescues him and takes him home. Later, Little Tree is orphaned once again when his Grandfather dies and his Grandmother follows soon after. Willow John takes him under his wing to learn more of the Cherokee way, and the story is told into adulthood by reminiscences.

Cast

Production
The screenplay for the film was adapted from the 1976 fictional memoir of the same title by Asa Earl Carter (published under the pseudonym Forrest Carter) about an orphaned boy raised by his paternal Scottish-descent grandfather and Cherokee grandmother in the Great Smoky Mountains. In 1991, nearly two decades after its publication, it was revealed that Carter had in fact been a segregationist, anti-Semite, and member of the Ku Klux Klan, which marred critical discussion of the book. Carter's true identity was also questioned after the book's publication in 1976, but he did not address inquiries regarding it, and died three years later in 1979.

Writer-director Richard Friedenberg adapted the screenplay shortly after completing his Norman Maclean adaptation of A River Runs Through It (1995). Commenting on the controversial nature of Carter as an individual, Friedenberg stated: "Here was this guy, who did bad things, disappeared off the face of the earth in Alabama, where he was a Ku Kluxer, and reappeared in the Oklahoma-Texas area near the Cherokee reservation of the western Cherokee nation, where he proceeded to write several books. It strikes me he spent his literary life, and whoever he was in his second phase, in some kind of grand apology for his first life." Friedenberg was originally drawn to the book and chose to adapt it as he felt that "characters and milieu they were in represented everything that was good about America and everything that was bad." Prior to Friedenberg's involvement, filmmakers Steven Spielberg and his former producing partnership between Peter Guber and Jon Peters had considered adapting the work into a feature film.

Joseph Ashton, who stars in the film as the titular Little Tree, is himself of Cherokee ancestry.

Reception

Box office
The Education of Little Tree had a limited release from Paramount Pictures, opening in 52 theaters in the United States on Christmas Day 1997. Paramount's own record-breaking box office hit Titanic opened only days before. The film had a domestic gross of $323,411.

Critical response
Kevin Thomas of the Los Angeles Times praised the film's visual elements and cinematography, but felt its political correctness was "heavy-handed," noting that "writer-director Richard Friedenberg...  lays on the political correctness with a fatally heavy hand. Of course, America's treatment of its native people has been a genocidal disgrace, but every white person in the picture is a buffoon or a racist or both, aside from the grandfather, who has embraced Cherokee culture and renounced his own, and a dirt-poor little girl (Mika Boorem, very winning) whom Little Tree befriends." The Chicago Tribunes Mark Caro wrote that the film "plays out with a certain sweetness...  But the plot eventually takes a predictable, Dickensian turn, as Little Tree is removed from his grandparents and placed in a school for Indians." Additionally, Caro felt the film was too didactic, noting: "The mistreatment of Native Americans by whites is a valid topic for a kids movie, but the treatment here is so heavy-handed that it begins to feel like a lecture." Writing for Film Journal International, David Noh also praised Anastas Michos' cinematography, which he wrote "thrillingly records the unearthly, sun-dappled beauty of the mountains...  The school scenes are appropriately Oliver Twist. But, for all of the importance placed on Little Tree's roots, the film spends far too much time around the moonshine still and hypocritical local church at the cost of other, more interesting lessons."

Roger Ebert of the Chicago Sun-Times awarded the film three out of four stars, praised the performances as "quietly well-acted," and deemed it a "fine family movie that will no doubt be ignored by the fine families of America...  Such movies as Little Tree are the kind that families can discuss afterward. There are truths to be found in them. And questions. "

On the internet review aggregator Rotten Tomatoes, the film holds a 59% approval rating, with a weighted average of 6.1 out of 10.

Accolades

References

External links

1997 films
American drama films
Cherokee in popular culture
1997 drama films
Films about Native Americans
Films about race and ethnicity
Films based on works by Forrest Carter
Films based on books
Films scored by Mark Isham
Films set in Tennessee
Films shot in Montreal
Paramount Pictures films
Films directed by Richard Friedenberg
1990s English-language films
1990s American films